Stefan Seidler is a Danish-German politician of the South Schleswig Voters' Association (SSW), the party representing the interests of the Danish and Frisian minority populations in Germany. He was elected to the Bundestag from Schleswig-Holstein in the 2021 German federal election. His election represented the first time the SSW won a seat since 1949. The SSW last contested a federal election in the 1961 West German election.

Early life and education 
Seidler was born in 1979 in Flensburg, West Germany, as the son of a Danish-born teacher and a timber salesman from Flensburg. After completing his secondary education at Duborg-Skolen, he studied at Aarhus University in Aarhus, Denmark, where he obtained a master's degree in political science and a diploma in political communication. He is a member of the Danish Association of Lawyers and Economists.

Political career 
Seidler has been politically active in both Denmark and Germany. In Aarhus, he was deputy chairman of Radikal Ungdom, the youth wing of the Danish Social Liberal Party, and later was that party's candidate for both the Danish and the European Parliament. He was a member of Flensburg's city council, worked as a political consultant in Southern Denmark, and in 2014, became Schleswig-Holstein's coordinator of relations with the Danish government.

In 2021, he contested the constituency of Flensburg – Schleswig, located at the German-Danish border, for the SSW. He was defeated by Robert Habeck from Alliance 90/The Greens, but won a seat on the party's state list.

Personal life 
Seidler is married and has two daughters.

References 

Living people
Danish minority of Southern Schleswig
21st-century German politicians
Members of the Bundestag 2021–2025
Politicians from Schleswig-Holstein
People from Flensburg
Members of the Bundestag for Schleswig-Holstein
1979 births
Aarhus University alumni
South Schleswig Voters' Association politicians